Old Millclose Mine was a lead mine near Wensley, in Derbyshire, England. The engine house of the mine survives as a ruin; it is a scheduled monument.

History
The engine house was built from 1859 to 1860 by Edward Wass, owner of Lea Lead Works, who re-opened this mine. It housed a Cornish engine, made by Thornewill and Warham of Burton-on-Trent, to pump water from the mine via the Watts engine shaft nearby. The engine was in use until the early 1870s.

Description
The arched opening that accommodated the beam was above the surviving section. There are foundations or bases of the other walls.

Nearby are the foundations of a boiler house, a winding engine house and a chimney. East of the engine house is the stone-lined shaft, now capped and covered with a grille.

See also
 Derbyshire lead mining history

References

Scheduled monuments in Derbyshire
Lead mines in England
Mines in Derbyshire